Fountain Green can refer to:
 Fountain Green, Illinois
 Fountain Green, Utah